Powell is an extinct town in Cass County, in the U.S. state of Missouri.

A post office called Powell Siding was established in 1892, and remained in operation until 1900. The community had the name of J. M. Powell, the original owner of the town site.

References

Ghost towns in Missouri
Former populated places in Cass County, Missouri